Konardihi is a census town in the Pandabeswar CD block in the Durgapur subdivision of the Paschim Bardhaman district in the Indian state of West Bengal.

Geography

Location

Konardihi, Nabgram, Chak Bankola, Sankarpur, Haripur, Bahula, Chhora and Parashkol form a cluster of census towns in the southern portion of Pandabeswar CD block.

Urbanisation
As per the 2011 census, 79.22% of the population of Durgapur subdivision was urban and 20.78% was rural. Durgapur subdivision has 1 municipal corporation at Durgapur and 38 (+1 partly) census towns  (partly presented in the map alongside; all places marked on the map are linked in the full-screen map).

Demographics
According to the 2011 Census of India, Konardihi had a total population of 8,448, of which 4,470 (53%) were males and 4,018 (47%) were females. Population in the age range 0–6 years was 902. The total number of literate persons in Konardihi was 5,734 (75.59% of the population over 6 years).

*For language details see Pandabeswar (community development block)#Language and religion

 India census, Konardihi had a population of 8,248. Males constitute 57% of the population and females 43%. Konardihi has an average literacy rate of 61%, higher than the national average of 59.5%: male literacy is 68%, and female literacy is 50%. In Konardihi, 11% of the population is under 6 years of age.

Infrastructure

According to the District Census Handbook 2011, Bardhaman, Konardihi covered an area of 7.11 km2. Among the civic amenities, the protected water-supply involved service reservoir, tap water from treated sources, uncovered wells. It had 764 domestic electric connections. Among the medical facilities it had were 1 dispensary/ health centre, 1 medicine shop. Among the educational facilities it had were 2 primary schools, 1 middle school, 1 secondary school,  the nearest senior secondary school at Ukhra 3.5 km away. Among the social, recreational and cultural facilities it had were 1 public library and 1 reading room. Among the important commodities it produced were paddy and coal.

Economy
It is in the heart of the coal mining zone.

As per the ECL website telephone numbers, operational collieries in the Bankola Area of Eastern Coalfields in 2018 are: Bankola Colliery, Khandra Colliery, Kumardih A Colliery, Kumardih B Colliery, Moira Colliery, Nakrakonda Colliery, Shankarpur Colliery, Shyamsundarpur Colliery and Tilaboni Colliery.

Education
Konardihi has one primary and one secondary schools.

Healthcare
Medical facilities (periodic medical examination centres and dispensaries) in the Bankola Area of ECL are available at Bankola Area PME Centre (with 30 beds + 2 cabins) (PO Ukhra), Khandra (PO Khandra), Bankola Colliery (PO Khandra), Bankola Area (PO Khandra), Shyamsundarpur (PO Khandra), Mahira (PO Moira), Tilaboni (PO Pandabeswar), Nakrakonda (PO Pandabeswar), Shankarpur (PO Sheetalpur), Kumardihi A (PO Pandabeswar), Kumardihi B (PO Pandabeswar).

References

Cities and towns in Paschim Bardhaman district